Rockford Iqra School is an Islamic private school in Rockford, Illinois. It has students from grades Pre-K3 to 8.

History
Rockford Iqra School was established in 1998 as an elementary school. The first high school class graduated in June 2010.

Students from Rockford Iqra School's first high school graduating class (2010-2017) were all accepted to college.

Extracurriculars and clubs
 Knitting Club
 Nasheed Club* Math Club

Educational institutions established in 1998
Private elementary schools in Illinois
High schools in Rockford, Illinois
Islamic schools in Illinois
Private middle schools in Illinois
Private high schools in Illinois
1998 establishments in Illinois